Gagnon is a surname, and may refer to:

 André Gagnon (1942–2020), Canadian musician and composer
 André-Philippe Gagnon (born 1962), Canadian comedian and impressionist
 Aurore Gagnon (1909–1920), victim of child abuse
 Christiane Gagnon (born 1948), Canadian politician
 Clarence Gagnon (1881–1942), Canadian painter
 Dave Gagnon (born 1967), Canadian ice hockey player
 Drew Gagnon (born 1990), American baseball player
 Édouard Gagnon (1918–2007), Canadian Roman Catholic cardinal 
 Gérard Gagnon (fl. 1970s), Canadian Redemptorist priest in Vietnam
 John Gagnon (1931–2016), pioneering sociologist
 Johnny Gagnon (1905–1984), Canadian ice hockey player
 Jonas Gagnon (1846–1915), American politician
 Louis-Philippe Gagnon (1909-2001), Canadian politician
 Lucien Gagnon (1793-1843), Farmer and leader of Lower Canada Rebellion
 Marc Gagnon (born 1975), Canadian short track speed skater
 Marcel Gagnon (born 1936), Canadian politician
 Mariano Gagnon (1929-2017), American Roman Catholic priest and missionary
 Marie-Michèle Gagnon (born 1989), Canadian alpine skier
 Monique Gagnon-Tremblay (born 1940), Canadian politician
 Onésime Gagnon (1888–1961), Canadian politician and lieutenant-governor of Québec
 Patrick Gagnon (born 1962), Canadian politician
 Philippe Gagnon (born 1974), Canadian TV and film director
 Philippe Gagnon (born 1980), Canadian Paralympic swimmer
 Philippe Gagnon (born 1992), Canadian football player
 Pierce Gagnon (born 2005), American child actor
 Pierre-Luc Gagnon (born 1980), professional skateboarder
 Roy Gagnon (1913–2000), American football player
 Rene Gagnon (1925–1979), U.S. Marines in photograph Raising the Flag on Iwo Jima
 Robert A. J. Gagnon (born 1958), American New Testament scholar and author, with a focus on issues of human sexuality and the Bible
 Sébastien Gagnon (born 1973), Canadian politician

See also
 Gagné (surname)

French-language surnames